The 2011 Autumn International Series was a series of three rugby league test matches played between France, Ireland and Scotland in 2011. It was a similar format to the Rugby League European Cup which was to next be held in 2012. The series included the first test match between Ireland and Scotland since the two teams gained test status.

Teams

Scotland vs Ireland

France vs Scotland

Ireland vs France
This will be the first international at Thomond Park.

Other Matches
Ireland also lost to Wales 6–30 and France lost to England 18–32. Both Wales and England were preparing for the Four Nations. France also lost to the England Knights 18–38.

References

External links

European Cup
European Nations Cup
European Cup, 2011
European Cup, 2011
European Cup, 2011
International rugby league competitions hosted by the United Kingdom
International rugby league competitions hosted by France
International rugby league competitions hosted by Ireland